Icteralaria is a genus of moths belonging to the family Tortricidae.

Species
Icteralaria ecuadorica Razowski, 1999
Icteralaria idiochroma Razowski, 1992
Icteralaria incusa (Meyrick, 1917)
Icteralaria paula Razowski & Becker, 2001
Icteralaria reducta Razowski & Becker, 2001

See also
List of Tortricidae genera

References

 , 1992, Misc. Zool. 14(1990): 110.
 , 2005, World Catalogue of Insects 5

External links

tortricidae.com

Euliini
Tortricidae genera